Seraphim of Sarov (– ), born Prókhor Isídorovich Moshnín (Mashnín) [Про́хор Иси́дорович Мошни́н (Машни́н)], is one of the most renowned Russian saints and is venerated in the Eastern Orthodox Church, and the Anglican Communion. He is generally considered the greatest of the 18th-century startsy (elders). Seraphim extended the monastic teachings of contemplation, theoria and self-denial to the layperson. He taught that the purpose of the Christian life was to receive the Holy Spirit. Perhaps his most popular quotation amongst his devotees is "acquire a peaceful spirit, and thousands around you will be saved."

Seraphim was glorified by the Russian Orthodox Church in 1903.

Life

Born 19 July (O.S.) 1754, Seraphim was baptized with the name of Prochor, after Prochorus, one of the first Seven Deacons of the Early Church and the disciple of John the Evangelist. His parents, Isidore and Agathia Moshnin, lived in Kursk, Russia. His father was a merchant. According to Eastern Orthodox Church tradition, a wonderworking icon of the Theotokos (Virgin Mary), Our Lady of Kursk, healed the young boy. Seraphim later experienced a number of visions.

In 1775, at the age of 17, he visited Dorothea of Kiev.

In 1777, at the age of 19, he joined the Sarov monastery as a novice (poslushnik). He was officially tonsured (took his monastic vows) in 1786 and given the religious name of Seraphim (which means "fiery" or "burning" in Hebrew). Shortly afterwards, he was ordained a hierodeacon (monastic deacon). In 1793, he was ordained as a hieromonk (monastic priest) and became the spiritual leader of the Diveyevo Convent, which has since come to be known as the Seraphim-Diveyevo Convent.

Soon after this, Seraphim retreated to a log cabin in the woods outside Sarov monastery and led a solitary lifestyle as a hermit for 25 years. During this time his feet became swollen to the point that he had trouble walking. Sarov's eating and fasting habits became more strict. At first he ate bread obtained from the monastery and vegetables from his garden, then only vegetables. For three years, he ate only grass.

One day, while chopping wood, Seraphim was attacked by a gang of thieves who beat him mercilessly with the handle of his own axe. He never resisted, and was left for dead. The robbers never found the money they sought, only an icon of the Theotokos (Virgin Mary) in his hut. Seraphim had a hunched back for the rest of his life. However, at the thieves' trial he pleaded to the judge for mercy on their behalf.  He spent five months in the monastery, recovering from his injuries and then returned to the wilderness.

After this incident Seraphim spent 1,000 successive nights on a rock in continuous prayer with his arms raised to the sky, a feat of asceticism deemed miraculous by the Eastern Orthodox Church, especially considering the pain from his injuries.

In 1815, in obedience to a reputed spiritual experience that he attributed to the Virgin Mary, Seraphim began admitting pilgrims to his hermitage as a confessor. He soon became immensely popular due to his reputation for healing powers and gift of prophecy. Hundreds of pilgrims per day visited him, drawn as well by his ability to answer his guests' questions before they could ask.

As extraordinarily harsh as Seraphim often was to himself, he was kind and gentle toward others – always greeting his guests with a prostration, a kiss, and exclaiming "Christ is risen!", and calling everyone "My joy". He died while kneeling before a tenderness icon of the Theotokos which he called "Joy of all Joys". This icon is kept currently in the chapel of the residence of the Patriarch of Moscow.

Relics, canonization and veneration

There was a widespread popular belief in Russia that a saint's remains were supposed to be incorrupt, which was not the case with Seraphim as was officially ascertained by a commission that researched his grave in January 1903. This, however, did not deter canonisation, spearheaded by archimandrite Seraphim Chichagov as well as popular veneration. At the end of January (O.S.) 1903, the Most Holy Synod, having received approval from Emperor Nicholas II, announced Seraphim's forthcoming glorification. In early July 1903, his relics were transferred from their original burial place to the church of Saints Zosimus and Sabbatius. Nicholas II and Tsarina Alexandra provided a new cypress coffin to receive the relics. The solemn canonisation (discovery of the relics) festivities took place in Sarov on 19 July (1 August) 1903 and were attended by the Tsar, his wife, his mother Empress Maria Feodorovna, and other senior members of the Imperial Family.

On 18 July 1903, Metropolitan Anthony Vadkovsky of St. Petersburg officiated at the Last Pannikhida (Memorial Service) in the Dormition Cathedral at Sarov, with the royal family in attendance. These would be the last prayers offered for Seraphim as a departed servant of God; from that time forward, prayers would instead be addressed to him as a saint. On 19 July, Seraphim's birthday, the late liturgy began at 8:00. At the Little Entrance, twelve archimandrites lifted the coffin from the middle of the church and carried it around the holy table (altar), then placed it into a special shrine which had been constructed for it.

The festivities at Sarov ended with the consecration of the first two churches dedicated to Saint Seraphim. The first had been constructed over his monastic cell in the wilderness of Sarov. The second church was consecrated on 22 July at the Diveyevo convent.

Following the Bolshevik Revolution, Soviet authorities severely persecuted religious groups.  As part of their persecution of Christians, they confiscated many relics of saints, including Seraphim. Furthermore, his biographer Seraphim Chichagov, who came to become a metropolitan, was arrested, sentenced to death and executed by firing squad in 1937 (and is also celebrated as a Russian Orthodox saint).

In 1991, Seraphim's relics were rediscovered after being hidden in a Soviet anti-religious museum for seventy years. This caused a sensation in post-Soviet Russia and throughout the Orthodox world. A crucession (religious procession) escorted the relics, on foot, all the way from Moscow to Diveyevo Convent, where they remain to this day.

On 19 October 2016, some relics of Seraphim were launched into space aboard the Soyuz MS-02.

Seraphim is remembered in the Anglican Communion with a commemoration on 2 January.

Pope John Paul II also referred to him as a saint.

Quotes
"Acquire a peaceful spirit, and around you thousands will be saved."

"It is necessary that the Holy Spirit enter our heart. Everything good that we do, that we do for Christ, is given to us by the Holy Spirit, but prayer most of all, which is always available to us."

Seraphim and Old Believers

The available information about relations between Seraphim of Sarov and Russian Old Believers tradition is somewhat contradictory. On the one hand, in all the memoirs and biographies, and in the collections of his sayings, he is undoubtedly portrayed as a convinced supporter of the reforms in the church and the official hierarchy. On the other hand, on icons of Seraphim he is usually depicted with a lestovka in his left hand, and in some cases even in old Russian, Old-Believers-style monastic garments (with a peculiar klobuk, and an old-fashioned cast bronze cross), as it is with these objects that he is depicted on the only lifetime portrait of him. The lestovka used by St.Seraphim is preserved up to this time among his personal belongings.

According to some sources, the known problems with the beatification of Seraphim of Sarov did happen exactly due to his general support and sympathy towards the Old Believers tradition, in which case the negative assessment of the old rite, ascribed to him, would have been interpreted as inventions of his followers, who tried to put their teacher in the most favorable light in the eyes of the official church functionaries. It was also suggested that Seraphim could have descended from a family of Old Ritualists, or from a family of secret, cryptic Old Believers (that were widespread in northern and eastern areas of Russia), possibly with consequent gradual shift towards edinoverie.

In spite of some (alleged) controversy, Seraphim was known, at least at the level of official hagiography, for his rejection of the Russian old rites. The majority of old believers authors doubt virtually all the facts known about Seraphim, as well as the very legitimacy of his beatification, and his name is often used in interdenominational polemics.

Notes

See also
 Hesychasm
 Diveevo convent
 Saint Seraphim of Sarov Church, Turnaevo
 Serafimovskoe Cemetery
 Thaumaturgy
 Tabor light

References

Further reading
 Dmitri Mereschkowski et al. Der letzte Heilige – Seraphim von Sarow und die russische Religiosität. Stuttgart 1994
 Archimandrite Lazarus Moore: St. Seraphim of Sarov – a Spiritual Biography. Blanco (Texas) 1994.
 Michaela-Josefa Hutt: Der heilige Seraphim von Sarow, Jestetten 2002, Miriam-Verlag, 
 Igor Smolitsch: Leben und Lehre der Starzen. Freiburg 2004
 Metropolit Seraphim: Die Ostkirche. Stuttgart 1950, pp. 282 ff.
 Paul Evdokimov: "Saint Seraphim of Sarow", in: The Ecumenical Review, April 1963
 Iwan Tschetwerikow: "Das Starzentum", in: Ev. Jahresbriefe; 1951/52, pp. 190 ff.
 Claire Louise Claus: "Die russischen Frauenklöster um die Wende des 18. Jahrhunderts", in: Kirche im Osten, Band IV, 1961.
 Bezirksrichter Nikolai Alexandrowitsch Motowilow: Die Unterweisungen des Seraphim von Sarow. Sergijew Possad 1914 (in Russian)
 Bishop Alexander (Mileant), "Saint Seraphim of Sarov", Orthodoxy and the world, December 2007.

External links
 Quotes by St. Seraphim of Sarov at Orthodox Church Quotes
 St. Seraphim article on OrthodoxWiki
 St. Seraphim of Sarov life, writings and icons  on Kursk Root (Korennaya) Icon Hermitage of the Birth of the Holy Theotokos site
 On the Acquisition of the Holy Spirit Spiritual conversation of Saint Seraphim
 A wonderful revelation to the world, www.stseraphim.org
 Uncovering of the relics of the Venerable Seraphim of Sarov Orthodox icon and synaxarion
 Glorification of Saint Seraphim. Sarov, 1903
 Photos of St. Seraphim glorification solemnity in Sarov (1903), Martha and Mary Convent site
 Photos of St. Seraphim glorification in Sarov (high res images), sarov.net
 St. Seraphim's biography by Archimandrite Nektarios Serfes
 Portal devoted to 100-th anniversary of St. Seraphim of Sarov glorification (in Russian)
 English page on Sarov monastery web-site

1759 births
1833 deaths
18th-century Christian saints
18th-century Christian mystics
19th-century Christian saints
19th-century Christian mystics
Ascetics
Eastern Orthodox mystics
Russian Eastern Orthodox priests
Russian saints of the Eastern Orthodox Church
Hesychasts
Starets
Miracle workers
18th-century Eastern Orthodox priests
19th-century Eastern Orthodox priests
Anglican saints